Runner Automobiles Ltd. (RAL) is a motorcycle and three-wheeler manufacturer in Bangladesh. Runner manufactures 12 different motorcycles ranging in  size from 80 to 150 CC, Runner has become the market leader in sub 100 CC motorcycle segment in the country. They are offering different motorcycles of various capacities and models. The principal product of the company is 2 Wheeler. Runner produces a product range varying from 80 CC to 150 CC, with 12 models of 2 Wheeler and scooters. The market for 2 Wheeler is on the rise in Bangladesh, riding on an increase in disposable income among the general population and a rapidly growing middle class. It has also started manufacturing 3-wheeler auto-rikshaw in its Blaluka factory.

History 
Hafizur Rahman Khan established and is the chairman of Runner Automobiles Limited. The company was incorporated as a private limited company in July 2000, and started its commercial operation since 2000 as an importer and trader of motorcycles. Later, it was converted to a public limited company in January 2012 and started the business of manufacturing and selling motorcycles, and later three-wheeled vehicles. Subsequently, the company established its facility of assembling engines and manufacturing other parts of motorcycles and presently established its effective distribution channel throughout the country with a network of more than 100 active dealers and over 270 sales centers along with own 27 operational showrooms. RAL's manufacturing facility is located at Bhaluka, Mymensingh. The factory is constructed with pre-fabricated steel structure on its own premises of 4,944.04 decimals land with a covered space of over 4,40,310 sft.

Technical collaborations
Runner has had technical collaborations with Dayang Motors and Freedom in the past. In 2016, Runner Automobiles signed a collaboration agreement with UM Motorcycles to manufacture UM motorcycles in Bangladesh under the name of UM-Runner . The motorcycles will be manufactured at Runner's motorcycle manufacturing facilities at Bhaluka while UM International LLC will provide R&D support in technological & engineering fields as well as global component sourcing. UM-Runner motorcycles manufactured in Bangladesh, entered the market in the second quadrant of 2018. As per of the agreement Runner Automobiles in future will produce & export bikes for UM for Nepal & Sri Lanka. It has technical collaboration with Indian automaker Bajaj Auto to build at least 70% parts 3-wheeler auto-rikshaw including the chassis, body welding and painting, except for some components of the engine. Experts from Bajaj have provided technical support to manufacturing processes and conducting test-runs for the vehicle. The 3-wheeler can run either on liquefied petroleum gas (LPG) or compressed natural gas (CNG).

Products 
The principal product of the company is 2 Wheeler & 3 Wheeler. The products are sold to customers and corporate clients through dealers, Company Owned Company Operated (COCO) stores, through tenders and recently initiated online retail mode. RAL's products range varies from 80cc to 150cc with about 12 models of 2 wheeler and scooters.

Factory 

Runner Automobile has its own manufacturing plant at Mymensingh District which is approximately 70 kilometer away from the capital Dhaka city. The factory covers an area of 200,000 square feet. The factory is constructed on prefabricated steel structure on the company's own land.

It employs around 450 employees which includes factory manager, engineers, technicians, and workers. It has production lines for pressing, wielding, assembling of engine, painting and quality control.

The factory is capable of producing four series of motorcycles. It produces twelve models of motorcycles. The plant capacity for producing motorcycles each day is 500.

Runner being a manufacturer has been gearing up its research and development facilities especially in areas of Product Development and Testing. Apart from having various machines and equipment like Salt Spray Test Chamber, Coordinate Measuring Machine, Suspension Test Machine, Universal Load Test Bench, Electric Component Test Bench etc. RAL has recently ordered certain latest Test facilities like 2 Wheeler & 3 Wheeler Engine and Chassis Dynamo-meters from India which would further help enhance the Products performance on parameters of Torque, Power Acceleration, Fuel efficiency, Braking, Gradient Drive-ability and emissions etc. These engine and chassis dynamometers would be commissioned within 2016 and strengthen RAL R&D efforts.

Brand ambassador 
Shakib Al Hasan, the captain of the Bangladesh cricket team, is the brand ambassador for Runner Group.

See also
List of companies of Bangladesh

References

Further reading
 
 
 
 
 
 
 
 

Motorcycle manufacturers of Bangladesh
Bangladeshi brands
Manufacturing companies based in Dhaka
2000 establishments in Bangladesh